Bleach is the third full-length album by the Christian rock band Bleach.  It was released in 1999 under Forefront Records.

Track listing
"Heartbeat" 3:29
"Straight Shooter" 3:16
"Once Again Here We Are" 2:39
"Race" 2:51
"You" 3:51
"All That's Sweet" 4:48
"Reasons" 3:55
"Breathe" 3:09
"All To You" 4:23
"Good" 4:28
"Sun Stands Still" 5:42
"What Will Your Anthem Be" 5:58

References

1999 albums
Bleach (American band) albums
ForeFront Records albums